ORP Kujawiak is the name of two ships of the Polish Navy:

, a torpedo boat
, a submarine, former soviet M-245.
, a destroyer escort

Polish Navy ship names